Fraction of inspired oxygen (FIO2), corrected denoted with a capital "I", is the molar or volumetric fraction of oxygen in the inhaled gas. Medical patients experiencing difficulty breathing are provided with oxygen-enriched air, which means a higher-than-atmospheric FIO2. Natural air includes 21% oxygen, which is equivalent to FIO2 of 0.21. Oxygen-enriched air has a higher FIO2 than 0.21; up to 1.00 which means 100% oxygen. FIO2 is typically maintained below 0.5 even with mechanical ventilation, to avoid oxygen toxicity, but there are applications when up to 100% is routinely used.

Often used in medicine, the FIO2 is used to represent the percentage of oxygen participating in gas-exchange.  If the barometric pressure changes, the FIO2 may remain constant while the partial pressure of oxygen changes with the change in barometric pressure.

Equations 
Abbreviated alveolar air equation

PAO2, PEO2, and PIO2 are the partial pressures of oxygen in alveolar, expired, and inspired gas, respectively, and VD/Vt is the ratio of physiologic dead space over tidal volume.

Medicine 
In medicine, the FIO2 is the assumed percentage of oxygen concentration participating in gas exchange in the alveoli.

Uses 
The FIO2 is used in the APACHE II (Acute Physiology and Chronic Health Evaluation II) severity of disease classification system for intensive care unit patients. For FIO2 values equal to or greater than 0.5, the alveolar–arterial gradient value should be used in the APACHE II score calculation. Otherwise, the PaO2 will suffice.

The ratio between partial pressure of oxygen in arterial blood (PaO2) and FIO2 is used as an indicator of hypoxemia per the American-European Consensus Conference on lung injury.  A high FIO2 has been shown to alter the ratio of PaO2/FIO2.

Pa/FI ratio 
The ratio of partial pressure arterial oxygen and fraction of inspired oxygen, known as the Horowitz index or Carrico index, is a comparison between the oxygen level in the blood and the oxygen concentration that is breathed.  This helps to determine the degree of any problems with how the lungs transfer oxygen to the blood. A sample of arterial blood is collected for this test. With a normal Pa of 60–100 mmHg and an oxygen content of FI of 0.21 of room air, a normal Pa/FI ratio ranges between 300 and 500 mmHg. A Pa/FI ratio less than or equal to 200 mmHg is necessary for the diagnosis of acute respiratory distress syndrome by the AECC criteria. The more recent Berlin criteria defines mild ARDS at a ratio of less than 300 mmHg.

A Pa/FI ratio less than or equal to 250 mmHg is one of the minor criteria for severe community acquired pneumonia (i.e., possible indication for inpatient treatment).

A Pa/FI ratio less than or equal to 333 mmHg is one of the variables in the SMART-COP risk score for intensive respiratory or vasopressor support in community-acquired pneumonia.

Example calculation After drawing an arterial blood gas sample from a patient the Pa is found to be 100 mmHg. Since the patient is receiving -saturated air resulting in a FI of 50% oxygen his calculated Pa/FI ratio would be 100 mmHg/0.50 = 200 mmHg.

Related mathematics

Alveolar air equation 
The alveolar air equation is the following formula, used to calculate the partial pressure of alveolar gas:

References

External links
FiO2 by Delivery Device  - Shows FiO2 by common oxygen deliver systems.

Pulmonology
Mechanical ventilation